Father O'Flynn is a 1935 British musical film directed by Wilfred Noy and Walter Tennyson and starring Thomas F. Burke, Jean Adrienne and Robert Chisholm. It was made Shepperton Studios.

Cast
 Thomas F. Burke as Father O'Flynn  
 Jean Adrienne as Macushla Westmacott  
 Robert Chisholm as Nigel Robertson 
 Henry Oscar as Westmacott 
 Ralph Truman as Fawcett  
 Dorothy Vernon as Bridget O'Flynn  
 Denis O'Neil as Tim Flannagan  
 Johnnie Schofield as Cassidy  
 Louis Goodrich as Sir John Robertson  
 Billy Holland as Muldoon, mob leader  
 Esma Lewis as Marie, French maid 
 Clifford Buckton 
 Robert Hobbs 
 Stanley Kirby 
 Ethel Revnell 
 The Sherman Fisher Girls as Dancers 
 Gracie West
 Ian Wilson

References

Bibliography
 Low, Rachael. Filmmaking in 1930s Britain. George Allen & Unwin, 1985.
 Wood, Linda. British Films, 1927-1939. British Film Institute, 1986.

External links

1935 films
British musical films
1935 musical films
Films shot at Shepperton Studios
Films set in England
Films directed by Wilfred Noy
Films directed by Walter Tennyson
British black-and-white films
1930s English-language films
1930s British films